Krupinski or Krupiński (feminine: Krupińska) is a surname of Polish origin. 
It may also be transliterated into other languages as Krupinsky.

People with the name include:
Franciszek Krupiński (1836–1898), Polish philosopher
Jerry W. Krupinski (contemporary), American politician from Ohio; state legislator
Józef Krupiński (1930–1998), Polish poet
Jennefa Krupinski, famous disc-jockey
Eileen Krupinski (contemporary), American politician from Ohio; state legislator
Emil Krupa-Krupinsky (Krupinski) (1872- 1924), German painter
Michał Krupiński (born 1981), Polish economist and government minister
Paulina Krupińska (born 1987), Polish beauty pageant titleholder 
Walter Krupinski (1920–2000), German Luftwaffe fighter ace of World War II
Waltrud Krupinski, a fictional character from the anime/manga Strike Witches

Polish-language surnames